OtterBox is a privately-owned consumer electronics accessory company based in Fort Collins, Colorado that produces water-resistant, shock-resistant, and drop-resistant cases for mobile devices. The company was founded in 1998 as a manufacturer of water-resistant boxes meant to house electronic devices, mostly catering to outdoor enthusiasts. Since then, OtterBox has produced both water-resistant and non-water-resistant protective cases for smartphones.

History 
In 1991, Curt Richardson made his first “OtterBox,” a completely water-resistant box, in his garage, after he noticed an increase in the popularity of water sports Richardson started his company in 1998, after he perfected his design of the Otterbox. He was strongly influenced by the 1986 book about business theories, E-Myth, by Michael Gerber. 

In 2001, the company began to produce iPod cases, which were introduced in 2004. OtterBox ceased the production of iPod cases in 2010,  to focus on mobile devices and technologies. , the company provides military-grade accessories for protecting battlefield military technology.

By early 2009, OtterBox had approximately 70 employees. In 2010, the company opened an office in Cork, Ireland with ten employees to handle the European, Middle Eastern, and African markets. In 2011, it opened a Hong Kong office and soon after, a smaller sales office in Dubai was set up. In 2012, OtterBox had 363 employees. In July 2012, Curt Richardson announced he would be stepping down as CEO, and taking up the position of Chairman. He was replaced by Brian Thomas.

Three start-up businesses grew from OtterBox: Nerdy Minds, Wild Rock, and 1OAK Technologies. All three founders of these businesses worked at OtterBox and now are backed by the company as they continue to develop their products and services. On May 22, 2013, OtterBox acquired the San Diego-based smartphone and tablet case manufacturer LifeProof. OtterBox made $347.5 million in revenue in 2011.

In November 2014, the company announced the departure of CEO Brian Thomas. The company appointed the company’s president Peter Lindgren to the role of CEO to replace Thomas, where he served until March of 2016.   In early 2016, Jim Parke, the CEO of Blue Ocean Enterprises, Inc, was appointed as the CEO of Otter Products, LLC.

Products 
, OtterBox provides cases for products by Amazon.com, Apple, BlackBerry, Google (Nexus), HTC, LG, Microsoft, Motorola, Nokia, OnePlus, and Samsung. The company has produced eleven different lines of cases:  Achiever Series, Defender Series, Resurgence Series, Symmetry Series, Commuter Series, Reflex Series, Armor series, Prefix Series, Preserver series, Profile series, Strada series, Pursuit series, Statement series, and the Drybox series. The Armor, Prefix, Reflex, and Preserver series are no longer in production. The company also manufactures screen protectors under their "Clearly Protected" line. Products are manufactured in Mexico, China and the United States. 

In May 2017, OtterBox announced a new product line, a line of coolers and tumblers called "Venture Coolers".

In January 2019, OtterBox announced a partnership with Corning to create a new line of Screen Protectors under the name "Amplify" for iPhone, Galaxy, and other mobile phones.

In 2020, OtterBox launched power banks, charging kits, and cables to provide durable universal charging capabilities that work with both Apple and Android products.

In 2021, OtterBox branched into gaming accessories with the introduction of mobile game clips and carrying cases for Xbox controllers and iPhones.

In 2022, OtterBox launched a program called the, "OtterBox Protection Program"  for all new cases.

Honors and awards 
In 2012, the company was named one of the Best Medium Workplaces by Great Place To Work for its expanding workforce, carefree and creative habitat, and 24 hours of paid time off for employee volunteer work. The OtterCares foundation has donated over 3 million dollars since 2012 and primarily focuses on education for young children.

References

External links 

Manufacturing companies established in 1998
Companies based in Fort Collins, Colorado
Luggage manufacturers